The number of Cambodian films dropped from more than 60 in 2006 to less than 20 in 2008 while the number of theaters dropped from 30 in Phnom Penh to 10.

2008

See also
2008 in Cambodia

References

2008
Films
Cambodian